Lieutenant-General Sir Terence Douglas Herbert McMeekin  (27 September 1918 – 3 August 1984) was a British Army officer who commanded 3rd Division.

Military career
McMeekin was commissioned into the Royal Artillery in 1938. He served in World War II as a general staff officer before becoming Brigade Major, Royal Artillery for 1st Airborne Division in 1945. He was appointed Commanding Officer of 29th Field Regiment, Royal Artillery in 1960, Chief Instructor (Tactics) at the School of Artillery at Larkhill in 1962 and Commander of 28th Commonwealth Infantry Brigade Group in Malaya in 1964, where his troops were responsible for capturing numerous Indonesian raiding forces, most prominently at Kesang River on 29 October 1964. He went on to be Director of Public Relations (Army) at the Ministry of Defence in 1967, General Officer Commanding (GOC) 3rd Division in 1968 and Commandant of the National Defence College in 1970. His last appointment was as GOC South East District in 1972 before retiring in 1975.

In retirement he was Lieutenant of the Tower of London from 1981 and 1983 and a Freeman of the City of London.

He lived at the Old Rectory in Beverston in Gloucestershire and there is a memorial to him at St Mary's Church there.

References

External links
Portrait of Sir Terence McMeekin

|-
 

1918 births
1984 deaths
British Army personnel of the Indonesia–Malaysia confrontation
British Army lieutenant generals
British Army personnel of World War II
Knights Commander of the Order of the Bath
Officers of the Order of the British Empire
Royal Artillery officers
British expatriates in China